John Charles Avise (born 1948) is an American evolutionary geneticist, conservationist, ecologist and natural historian. He is a Distinguished Professor of Ecology & Evolution, University of California, Irvine, and was previously a Distinguished Professor of Genetics at the University of Georgia.

Born in Grand Rapids, Michigan, he received his B.S. in 1970 in Natural Resources from the University of Michigan; his M.A.in 1971 in Zoology from the University of Texas at Austin; and his Ph.D. in 1975 in Genetics from the University of California, Davis. Avise's research entails the use of molecular markers to analyze ecological, behavioral, and evolutionary processes in nature.
It covers a broad spectrum of topics: genetic parentage, reproductive modes, population structure, speciation, hybridization, introgression, phylogeography, systematics, and phylogenetics. He has conducted research on diverse animal taxa ranging from corals and sponges to representatives of all the major vertebrate groups.

Research and scientific contributions
In 1972, Avise published the first multi-locus allozyme analysis in any fish species, and uncovered a profound effect of genetic drift in nature.  During the 1970s and 1980s, his protein-electrophoretic work on many fishes, mammals, and birds demonstrated that natural populations are genetically highly polymorphic and that molecular markers can be utilized to address many natural-history topics that previously had been analyzed solely from phenotypic data.  He thereby helped to pioneer the fields of molecular ecology and molecular evolution.  In 1994, he published Molecular Markers, Natural History and Evolution, a comprehensive textbook on the application of genetic markers in ecological, behavioral, and evolutionary contexts.
In the late 1970s, he was among the first to introduce mitochondrial (mt) DNA to population biology.  This seminal work laid the foundation for phylogeography, a field for which he is recognized as the founding father. Among the many phylogeographic applications for which his laboratory paved the way were genetic assessments of marine and freshwater turtles, catadromous eels, unisexual fishes, and regional assemblages of birds, fishes, mammals, herps, and marine invertebrates. In the 1990s, Avise capitalized upon highly polymorphic microsatellite loci to analyze animal mating systems in nature, on creatures ranging from sea spiders and snails to polyembryonic armadillos to numerous fishes, including male-pregnant pipefishes and seahorses, and hermaphroditic killifishes. This line of inquiry eventuated in many articles plus a trilogy of books dealing with evolutionary perspectives on clonality (2008), hermaphroditism (2011), and pregnancy (2013). In addition to research in molecular ecology and evolution, Avise has published on the relevance of evolutionary genetics to human affairs ranging from religious beliefs, to the human genome, to genetically modified organisms, to the history and philosophy of science.  In 2006, Avise helped to inaugurate a series of annual Sachler Colloquia, sponsored by the National Academy of Sciences, entitled "In the Light of Evolution" (ILE).  Each ILE installment highlights a topic that can be informed by evolutionary thought and has broader societal relevance.  Proceedings of ten ILE colloquia were published in PNAS, and most also appeared as edited books from the National Academies Press.

In 2020, Avise retired from the University of California Irvine so his status is now Distinguished Professor Emeritus at that institution. In 2021, Avise donated all of his writings (including 32 books plus 365 journal articles) to the Library of the American Philosophical Society in Philadelphia, PA.

Honors and distinctions
1985: Fellow, American Association for the Advancement of Science
1988: Lamar Dodd Award, University of Georgia
1991: Member, National Academy of Sciences USA
1992: Sloan Foundation Fellow in Molecular Evolution
1994: Earle R. Greene Award, Georgia Ornithological Society
1994: President, Society for the Study of Evolution
1994: Fellow, American Ornithologists' Union
1994: Fellow, American Academy of Arts and Sciences
1997: William Brewster Memorial Award, American Ornithologists' Union
1997: Wilhelmine E. Key Award, American Genetic Association
1998: Pew Fellow in Marine Conservation
2000: President, American Genetic Association
2004: President, Society for Molecular Biology and Evolution
2006: Molecular Ecology Prize, Molecular Ecology Journal
2007: Alfred Russel Wallace Award, International Biogeography Society
2010: Distinguished Faculty Award for Research, University of California at Irvine
2011: Member, American Philosophical Society
2014: Genetics Hall of Excellence, American Fisheries Society

Publications
 http://faculty.sites.uci.edu/johncavise/publications/

Some of his 32 Books:
 Avise, John C. (2016), Sketches of Nature: A Geneticist's Look at the Biological World During a Golden Era for Molecular Ecology, Academic Press. 
 Avise, John C. [and Francisco J. Ayala] (2014), Essential Readings in Evolutionary Biology, Johns Hopkins University Press. 
 Avise, John C. (2014), Conceptual Breakthroughs in Evolutionary Genetics: A Brief History of Shifting Paradigms, Academic Press. 
 Avise, John C. (2013), Evolutionary Perspectives on Pregnancy, Columbia University Press. 
 Avise, John C. (2011), Hermaphroditism: A Primer on the Biology, Ecology, and Evolution of Dual Sexuality, Columbia University Press. .
 Avise, John C. (2010), Inside the Human Genome: A Case for Non-Intelligent Design, Oxford University Press.  .

References

1948 births
21st-century American biologists
Living people
Writers from Grand Rapids, Michigan
University of Michigan School of Natural Resources and Environment alumni
University of California, Davis alumni
University of California, Irvine faculty
University of Georgia faculty
Fellows of the American Academy of Arts and Sciences
Members of the United States National Academy of Sciences
Sloan Research Fellows
Members of the American Philosophical Society